Chumphu Phon is a sub-district (tambon) in Si Wilai District, in Bueng Kan Province, northeastern Thailand. As of 2010, it had a population of 7,475 people and jurisdiction over 12 villages. It lies along Thailand Route 222, south of Si Wilai and north of Phon Charoen.

References

Tambon of Bueng Kan province
Populated places in Bueng Kan province